Iain Rattray is a British actor.

He appeared in The Bill, Howards' Way, Chancer, Casualty, Boon, Minder, Grange Hill, London's Burning, Doctor Who, Between the Lines, and the TV MiniSeries Wild Justice, Jack the Ripper.

References

External links
 

Year of birth missing (living people)
Living people
British male television actors